Perittia constantinella is a moth in the family Elachistidae. It was described by Rebel in 1901. It is found in Algeria.

References

Moths described in 1901
Elachistidae
Moths of Africa